Kafr Qaddum is a Palestinian town in the northern West Bank, located 13 kilometers west of Nablus and 17 kilometers east of Qalqilya in the Qalqilya Governorate. Surrounding towns include Jit to the east and Hajjah to the south. According to the Palestinian Central Bureau of Statistics (PCBS), the town had a population of approximately 3,500 inhabitants in mid-year 2006.

Kafr Qaddum's total land area consists of nearly 19,000 dunams (about 8,000 under Palestinian civil administration and 11,000 under complete Israeli control). Its built-up area consists of 529 dunams. Olive groves make up 80% of the remaining land, 15% is used for vegetation purposes, and 5% are planted crops. Israel has expropriated roughly 2,500 dunams (618 acres) for the use of settlements nearby

Since 2011, residents have regularly protested the Israeli blockade of their village, and through to 2020, 100 members of the community, including 6 minors, have been shot and wounded by Israeli troops. 170 villagers have been arrested by the IDF and constrained by military courts to pay fines collectively amounting to US$74,200.

Location
Kafr Qaddum is located 17.32 km north-east of Qalqiliya. It is bordered by Jit village to the east, Immatain to the south, Kur and Hajja village to the west, and Beit Lid, Qusin and Deir Sharaf to the north.

History

Ancient period 
According to archaeological evidence, Kafr Qaddum has been inhabited since the Early Bronze Age. On the hill south of the village is the archeological site of Khirbet 'Asafeh, which was part of one settlement that spread over several hills in the area. In 1979, an archaeological excavation was conducted at the site and remains from the Bronze Age, Iron Age, Persian and Hellenistic periods were discovered. Moreover, remains from the Roman period were discovered at the site, including several structures and a kokhim-style tomb.

In the second century, a large Samaritan settlement was built on the site, which existed for centuries. It was mainly stone-built dwellings, according to Roman building tradition. Its inhabitants engaged in agriculture, mainly growing olives for oil. Three ancient olive presses were discovered near the village. A destruction layer found in a number of buildings from the end of the fifth century is probably related to the Samaritan revolts. The settlement continued to prosper until the early Islamic period, and it seems that its Samaritan residents were forced to convert to Islam, and in part the settlement has survived continuously since.

Ottoman era
Kafr Qaddum appeared in 1596 Ottoman tax registers as being in the Nahiya of Jabal Qubal of the Liwa of Nablus. It had a population of 19 households and 2 bachelors, all Muslim. The villagers paid taxes on wheat, barley, summer crops, olives, and goats or beehives, and a press for olives or grapes; a total of 4,700 Akçe.

In 1838, Kefr Kaddum was noted as a village located in the District of Jurat 'Amra, south of Nablus.

In 1852, it was by noted Biblical scholar Edward Robinson on his travels in the region, and in 1882 the PEF's Survey of Western Palestine (SWP) the village (called Kefr Kaddum) was described as "A good-sized village on low ground, with wells and olives; it has a watch-tower on the side of the chalk hill rising over it on the east, and is supplied by wells; the houses are of stone."

British Mandate period
In a 1922 census of Palestine conducted by the British Mandate authorities, Kufr Qaddum had a population of 874 inhabitants, all Muslims, increasing in the 1931 census to 963, again all Muslim, in 234 houses.

In the 1945 statistics the population was 1,240, all Muslims, with 18,931 dunams of land, according to an official land and population survey. Of this, 2,945 dunams were for plantations or irrigated land, 7,184 for cereals, while 69 dunams were built-up (urban) land.

Jordanian era
In the wake of the 1948 Arab–Israeli War, and after the 1949 Armistice Agreements, Kafr Qaddum came under Jordanian rule.

The Jordanian census of 1961 found 1,701 inhabitants.

1967–present

Since the Six-Day War in 1967, Kafr Qaddum has been under Israeli occupation.

After the 1995 accords, 44.6% of village land was classified as Area B, while the remaining 55.4% was classified as Area C. Up until 2013 Israel had confiscated 2,031 dunums of village land for the Israeli settlements of Kedumim Zefon, Jit (Mitzpe Yishai), and Giv'at HaMerkaziz; presently all part of Kedumim.

Since 2003, the road between Kafr Qaddum and Nablus is blocked thus elongating the travel distance by 14 km. Since July 2011, weekly demonstrations have been held in a demand to re-open the road.

Land issues
In the Mitzpe Yishai neighborhood of Kedumim, there are accusations that the Israelis have improperly taken control of private Palestinian land. The Israeli Civil Administration calls it "theft", though it occurred in an "orderly manner", but without any official authorization.

Main entrance 
In 2003, the Israeli military closed the main entrance of the village that connects it to Nablus with a permanent roadblock, in addition, a dirt mound was put one kilometer before the roadblock, isolating one family house which made it unreachable by vehicles. In 2010, after waiting for five years for an Israeli court decision, it was ruled that the roadblock is illegal, but the court also stated that the road is "too dangerous to travel" so the road remained blocked.

The roadblock makes it difficult for people to reach their farmlands because they are prohibited from driving, so they must walk on foot and carry their equipment and harvest. It also delays the fifteen minute journey to Nablus to forty minutes.

Events
In 2012, an Israeli soldier was under investigation for the theft of a large sum of money and gold from during a raid against a resident of Kafr Qaddum.
On 2 January 2014, 85-year-old Saeed Jaser Alim became the "first Palestinian casualty of conflict with Israel in 2014; he died following a clash with Israeli soldiers at Kafr Qaddum near Nablus". Villagers say Israeli soldiers fired teargas canisters at them, one of which entered his home, and he subsequently died.
In January 2014, a large force of Israeli soldiers entered the village in the middle of the night, seeking "two wanted men", who turned out to be two boys, aged 11 and 13. As they were leaving, they threw stun grenades into the yards of the homes they passed.
In December 2014, Bashar Saleh was shot in the leg while standing with his camera in a group of journalists.
In October 2015 Ahmed Tala’at, a photographer, was shot in the backside while standing with a group of journalists, armed only with his cameras and a gasmask.
Muayyed Shteiwi, a nurse, who brandishes a Palestinian flag at demonstrations,  was shot near the groin and in the back when, hearing noises of confrontation, he left the yard of a mosque to observe what was happening.
In March 2016 an Israeli border policeman shot Khaled Shteiwi/Shatawi (11) in the leg. When an adult villager came to assist him, he too was shot by another soldier.
On 12 July 2019, Abd el-Rahman Shatawi,  aged 9, was shot in the head with a live bullet by an Israeli sniper posted 100 metres away while watching a demonstration that was taking place 200 metres from his friend's home. He has since been confined to a wheelchair.
30 January 2020 No demonstrations took place that day when Mohammed Shteiwi/Shatawi (14), hiding in a grove when soldiers arrived, took a head shot from a soldier firing a plastic-coated metal bullet at close range.  He had peeked out to check out what was going on, and now lies in a vegetative state.
In August 2020, Israeli placed three boxes containing explosive devices in the village. One of them was found by a child and lightly injured an adult when he shook it. An army source said that the boxes were placed "for deterrence".

Economy 
Prior to the Second Intifada, about 50% of the Kafr Qaddum's economy depended on work in Israel as the primary source of income, 20% depended on agriculture and animal raising, while 30% depended on jobs in private and public sectors. After 2002, over 75% of the population became jobless as business became the only other alternative for income generation. Emigration has registered a record level during the past two years, ranging between 10-15% of the total population.

References

Bibliography

External links
Kafr Qaddum, ISM
 Kufr Qaddum, IWPS
Welcome To Kafr Qaddum
Survey of Western Palestine, Map 11:    IAA, Wikimedia commons 
 KAfr Qaddum Village (Fact Sheet),  Applied Research Institute–Jerusalem (ARIJ)
 Kafr Qaddum Village Profile, ARIJ
  Kafr Qaddum, aerial photo, ARIJ
 Development Priorities and Needs in Kafr Qaddum, ARIJ
  New Colonial Activity in Kafr Qadoom Village – Qalqilyia District, March 14, 2000,  POICA
  Violations during the olive picking season are continuing 21, October, 2009, POICA
Several injured in Friday West Bank demonstrations, Mar.16, 2012 Haaretz
IDF using dogs to police anti-fence protests in West Bank Officer from Oketz canine unit let his dog loose on protesters in Kfar Kadum, near Nablus, Mar.19, 2012, Haaretz

Qalqilya Governorate
Towns in the West Bank
Municipalities of the State of Palestine
Ancient Samaritan settlements